Jean Simon is a former Guernsey international lawn bowler.

Bowls career
Simon has represented Guernsey at two Commonwealth Games, at the 1994 Commonwealth Games and the 2002 Commonwealth Games.

In 1993, she won the triples bronze medal, with Eunice Thompson and Sally Paul, at the Atlantic Bowls Championships and in 1997 added the pairs bronze (with Anne Simon) from the Llandrindod Wells event.

References

Living people
Guernsey female bowls players
Bowls players at the 1994 Commonwealth Games
Bowls players at the 2002 Commonwealth Games
Year of birth missing (living people)